The Alton Estate is a large council estate situated in Roehampton, southwest London. One of the largest council estates (public housing) in the UK, it occupies an extensive area of land west of Roehampton village and runs between the Roehampton Lane through-road and Richmond Park Golf Courses.

Designed by a London County Council design team led by Rosemary Stjernstedt, the estate is renowned for its mix of low and high-rise modernist architecture consisting of Alton East (1958) styled in a subtle Scandinavian-influenced vernacular and its slightly later counterpart: Alton West (1959). At Highcliffe Drive on Alton West the LCC essentially retained the Georgian landscape and placed within it five ultra-modern slab blocks: Binley, Winchfield, Dunbridge, Charcot and Denmead Houses (all grade II* listed buildings), inspired by Le Corbusier's Unité d'habitation.

Overall, the estate, which celebrated its 50th Anniversary in 2009, has over 13,000 residents, making it one of the largest in the United Kingdom. The architecture is mainly split between brutalist architecture and its Scandinavian-inspired counterpart.

Planning for redevelopment of the area is currently under way by Wandsworth Council.

The Alton is sub-divided into ten smaller neighborhoods, each with their own signage: Arnewood, Danebury, Highcliffe, Hyacinth, Ibsley, Manresa, Norley, Tangley, Tunworth and Wanborough.

Alton East
The Alton East Estate consists of point blocks and low-level housing. The design "represents a desire by some architects to formulate a British version of modernism that was more sensitive to context and referenced a traditional vernacular."

Alton West

At the time of its completion in 1958, Alton West was considered by many British architects to be the crowning glory of post-World War II social housing. While Victorian town houses were demolished to make room for the slab blocks, the landscape and trees were left intact, and the new buildings were slotted in between the existing greenery.

Notable buildings and establishments

Roehampton has a rich history and, now, to a certain extent so does the Alton Estate itself. Within the locale of the footprint occupied by the estate there are several notable buildings and establishments
 The Cornerstone – (Roehampton Parish Great Hall – also serves as a community centre providing social facilities for locals)
 The Highcliffe – (Perhaps the Alton's most famous landmarks: 5 Grade II* Listed tower buildings, developed as part of the Narrow-Fronted Maisonette concept of the 1950s inspired by Le Corbusier)
 Maryfield Convent – (An order called The Poor Servants of the Mother of God)
 Mount Clare – (A smaller campus which is part of Roehampton University centered around an eponymous manor house)
 Parkstead House – (A stately home with a long and varied history which now forms a main campus of Roehampton University)
 Clanfield House is one of eight red brick blocks of maisonettes built during the 1950s, on the east section of the Estate. It is an example of early attempts to create urban utopian communities, particularly in the use of allotments in front of Clanfield House.

Transport
Bus routes 85, 170, 430, 265, and 419 serve the Alton Estate.

See also
 Alexandra Road estate, Camden
 Brunswick Centre, Bloomsbury
 Thamesmead, Bexley and Greenwich
 Aylesbury Estate

References

External links

Brutalist architecture in London
Housing estates in the London Borough of Wandsworth
Roehampton